Johann Wenzel Kautsky (or Jan Václav Kautský; 14 September 1827, Prague – 4 September 1896, Sankt Gilgen) was a Czech scenic designer, landscape painter and co-owner of "Brioschi, Burghart und Kautsky", a stage decorating company in Vienna.

Life 
He studied at the Academy of Fine Arts, Prague, from 1844 to 1850 with Christian Ruben (figurative painting) and Max Haushofer (landscape painting). In 1850, he went to  Düsseldorf to continue his studies with Johann Wilhelm Schirmer. The following year, he began work in Prague as a theater decorator. In 1854, he married the actress and writer Minna Jaich, daughter of the scenic designer Anton Jaich. They had a daughter and three sons, one of whom was the Marxist theoretician Karl Kautsky.

In 1863, he was appointed a decorative artist for the Vienna State Opera. The following year, he became a partner in the studios of Carlo Brioschi. Two years later the Viennese Court Painter, Hermann Burghart, was added to the partnership, creating the firm of "Brioschi, Burghart und Kautsky, k.u.k. Hoftheatermaler in Wien", which employed dozens of carpenters, blacksmiths, mechanics and clerks in addition to their painters; among whom were Georg Janny, Ferdinand Brunner and Alfons Mucha. The studio received many orders from abroad as well as locally. Among their regular customers was the Metropolitan Opera in New York.

Brioschi and Kautsky slowly gave up active participation in the firm, which was led by Burghart until his retirement in 1892. That same year, Kautsky bought out his partners and handed the company over to his sons, Hans and Fritz, who joined with the Italian-born painter, and operated under the name "Kautskys Söhne und Rottonara". They remained in business for several more decades.

References

Further reading 
  (Online)
 Robin Thurlow Lacy: Kautsky, Johann. In: A biographical dictionary of scenographers : 500 B.C. to 1900 A.D. Greenwood Press, New York 1990, pp. 340–341.
 Kautsky, Johann (Jan). In: Thieme-Becker: Allgemeines Lexikon der Bildenden Künstler von der Antike bis zur Gegenwart. Vol.20, E. A. Seemann, Leipzig 1927, pg.35

External links 

 More works by Kautsky @ ArtNet

1827 births
1896 deaths
Artists from Prague
People from the Kingdom of Bohemia
Czech scenic designers
Academy of Fine Arts, Prague alumni
19th-century Czech painters
Czech male painters
19th-century Czech male artists
Karl Kautsky